Pedro Henrique Oldoni do Nascimento (born 26 September 1985), known as Pedro Oldoni, is a Brazilian footballer who plays for Sertãozinho as a striker.

Club career
Oldoni was born in Pato Branco, Paraná. He made his senior debuts with local Cianorte, before moving to state giants Atlético Paranaense in 2005.

After failing to establish himself into the starting XI, Oldoni moved to La Liga side Real Valladolid on loan on 31 January 2009. He made his debut on 15 February, coming on as a late substitute in a 2–3 loss at UD Almería. He was sparingly used during the campaign, as the Castile and León side narrowly avoided relegation.

On 27 July, Oldoni joined Atlético Mineiro also in a temporary deal. In January of the following year he changed teams and countries again, joining C.D. Nacional also in a loan deal. He returned to Furacão in August 2011, and spent almost a year nursing a knee injury.

Oldoni returned to the fields only in the 2012 summer, and was assigned to Atlético's B-team. In January 2013 he moved to Vitória in a permanent deal, but left the club a year later, joining Turkish Süper Lig side Sivasspor.

On 18 June 2014 Oldoni returned to Brazil, signing a short-term deal with Portuguesa. On 16 December, after appearing rarely, he joined Macaé Esporte, which had been recently promoted from Série C.

References

External links

 rubronegro.net

1985 births
Living people
People from Pato Branco
Association football forwards
Brazilian footballers
Brazilian expatriate footballers
Campeonato Brasileiro Série A players
Campeonato Brasileiro Série B players
Campeonato Brasileiro Série C players
UAE First Division League players
Club Athletico Paranaense players
Clube Atlético Mineiro players
La Liga players
Primeira Liga players
Süper Lig players
Real Valladolid players
C.D. Nacional players
Al Dhaid SC players
Esporte Clube Vitória players
Sivasspor footballers
Associação Portuguesa de Desportos players
Macaé Esporte Futebol Clube players
Associação Atlética Anapolina players
Sociedade Esportiva e Recreativa Caxias do Sul players
Expatriate footballers in Spain
Expatriate footballers in Portugal
Expatriate footballers in Turkey
Brazilian expatriate sportspeople in Spain
Brazilian expatriate sportspeople in Turkey
Brazilian expatriate sportspeople in the United Arab Emirates
Sportspeople from Paraná (state)